The 2010 Florida Gators baseball team represented the University of Florida in the sport of baseball during the 2010 college baseball season. The Gators competed in Division I of the National Collegiate Athletic Association (NCAA) and the Eastern Division of the Southeastern Conference (SEC). They played their home games at Alfred A. McKethan Stadium, on the university's Gainesville, Florida campus. The team was coached by Kevin O'Sullivan, who was in his third season at Florida.

Roster

Schedule 

! style="background:#FF4A00;color:white;"| Regular season
|- valign="top" 

|- align="center" bgcolor="ddffdd"
| February 19 ||  ||No. 9
| McKethan Stadium || 6–2 ||Panteliodis (1–0)
|Fontanez (0–1)
|Larson (1)
|3,309
| 1–0 || –
|- align="center" bgcolor="ddffdd"
| February 20 || South Florida ||No. 9
| McKethan Stadium || 9–1 ||Johnson (1–0)
|Delphey (0–1)
|None
|3,723
| 2–0 || –
|- align="center" bgcolor="ddffdd"
| February 21 || South Florida ||No. 9
| McKethan Stadium || 7–610 ||Panteliodis (2–0)
|Quackenbush (0–1)
|None
|3,422
| 3–0 || –
|- align="center" bgcolor="ddffdd"
| February 24 || UCF ||No. 9
|McKethan Stadium
| 7–6 ||Randall (1–0)
|Adkins (0–1)
|Chapman (1)
|2,521
| 4–0 || –
|- align="center" bgcolor="ddffdd"
| February 25 ||  ||No. 9
| McKethan Stadium || 13–3 ||Toledo (1–0)
|Tedesco (0–1)
|None
|2,879
| 5–0 || –
|-

|- align="center" bgcolor="ffdddd"
| March 2 || vs. No. 3 Florida StateRivalry ||No. 6|| Steinbrenner FieldTampa, FL || 5–10 ||Parker (1–0)||DeSclafani (0–1)||Bennett (1)||8,348|| 5–1|| –
|- align="center" bgcolor="ddffdd"
| March 5 || at No. 14 Rivalry||No. 6|| Alex Rodriguez ParkCoral Gables, FL || 7–1 ||Panteliodis (3–0)||Hernandez (1–1)||Maronde (1)||4,274|| 6–1|| –
|- align="center" bgcolor="ffdddd"
| March 6 || at No. 14 Miami (FL)Rivalry||No. 6|| Alex Rodriguez Park || 6–9 ||Whaley (2–0)||Johnson (1–1)||Gutierrez (3)||4,426|| 6–2|| –
|- align="center" bgcolor="ddffdd"
| March 7 || at No. 14 Miami (FL)Rivalry||No. 6|| Alex Rodriguez Park || 4–2 ||Toledo (2–0)||Erickson (1–1)||Chapman (2)||4,610|| 7–2|| –
|- align="center" bgcolor="ddffdd"
| March 9 ||  ||No. 8|| McKethan Stadium || 8–2 ||Randall (2–0)||Sorkin (0–1)||None||2,435|| 8–2|| –
|- align="center" bgcolor="ddffdd"
| March 10 ||Illinois State||No. 8|| McKethan Stadium || 8–0 ||DeSclafani (1–1)||Learnard (0–1)||None||2,458|| 9–2|| –
|- align="center" bgcolor="ddffdd"
| March 12 ||  ||No. 8|| McKethan Stadium || 6–0 ||Panteliodis (4–0)||Markham (0–2)||None||2,209|| 10–2|| –
|- align="center" bgcolor="ddffdd"
| March 13 || Charleston Southern ||No. 8|| McKethan Stadium || 16-10 ||Poovey (1–0)||McCready (0–3)||Barfield (1)||2,993|| 11–2|| –
|- align="center" bgcolor="ffdddd"
| March 14 || Charleston Southern ||No. 8|| McKethan Stadium || 3–6 ||Thornburg (3–1)||Toledo (2–1)||None||2,784|| 11–3|| –
|- align="center" bgcolor="ddffdd"
| March 15 ||||No. 11|| McKethan Stadium || 9–3 ||DeSclafani (2–1)||Kirk (0–2)||Barfield (2)||2,073|| 12–3|| –
|- align="center" bgcolor="ddffdd"
| March 16 ||No. 5 Florida StateRivalry||No. 11|| McKethan Stadium || 8–5 ||Maronde (1–0)||Scantling (0–1)||Chapman (3)||4,773|| 13–3|| –
|- align="center" bgcolor="ddffdd"
| March 19 ||  ||No. 11|| McKethan Stadium || 7–2 ||Panteliodis (5–0)||Graveman (1–1)||None||3,482|| 14–3|| 1–0
|- align="center" bgcolor="ddffdd"
| March 20 || Mississippi State ||No. 11|| McKethan Stadium || 5–4 ||Maronde (2–0)||Girodo (0–1)||Chapman (4)||4,823|| 15–3|| 2–0
|- align="center" bgcolor="ddffdd"
| March 21 || Mississippi State ||No. 11|| McKethan Stadium || 4–1 ||Chapman (1–0)||Reed (0–2)||None||2,410|| 16–3|| 3–0
|- align="center" bgcolor="ddffdd"
| March 24 ||||No. 9|| McKethan Stadium || 13–8 ||Franklin (1–0)||Barnes (0–1)||None||3,390|| 17–3|| –
|- align="center" bgcolor="ffdddd"
| March 26 ||at No. 18 ||No. 9||Swayze FieldOxford, MS
| 2–3 ||Pomeranz (4–0)||Panteliodis (5–1)||Huber (2)||8,417|| 17–4|| 3–1
|- align="center" bgcolor="ffdddd"
| March 27 ||at No. 18 Ole Miss||No. 9||Swayze Field|| 3–15 ||Barrett (6–0)||Randall (2–1)||Crouse (1)||8,699|| 17–5|| 3–2
|- align="center" bgcolor="ddffdd"
| March 28 ||at No. 18 Ole Miss||No. 9||Swayze Field|| 13–1 ||Johnson (2–1)||Rothlin (3–2)||None||6,116|| 18–5|| 4–2
|- align="center" bgcolor="ffdddd"
| March 30 || vs. No. 6 Florida StateRivalry ||No. 11|| Baseball GroundsJacksonville, FL || 2–7 ||Busch (4–0)||Randall (2–2)||None||9,276|| 18–6|| –
|-

|- align="center" bgcolor="ddffdd"
| April 2 ||No. 17 ||No. 11|| McKethan Stadium ||3–2||Barfield (1–0)||Gray (4–3)||Chapman (5)||4,093||19–6||5–2
|- align="center" bgcolor="ddffdd"
| April 3 ||No. 17 Vanderbilt||No. 11|| McKethan Stadium ||7–3||Johnson (3–1)||Hill (3–2)||None||3,684||20–6||6–2
|- align="center" bgcolor="ffdddd"
| April 4 ||No. 17 Vanderbilt||No. 11|| McKethan Stadium ||0–7||Armstrong (4–0)||Randall (2–3)||None||2,973||20–7||6–3
|- align="center" bgcolor="ddffdd"
| April 6 ||||No. 9|| McKethan Stadium ||12–2||Larson (1–0)||Glenn (2–4)||None||3,515||21–7||–
|- align="center" bgcolor="ddffdd"
| April 9 ||at ||No. 9||Knoxville, TN
|4–2||Panteliodis (6–1)||Morgado (2–4)||Chapman (6)||2,519||22–7||7–3
|- align="center" bgcolor="ffdddd"
| April 10 ||at Tennessee||No. 9||||4–12||McCray (4–3)||Johnson (3–2)||None||2,493||22–8||7–4
|- align="center" bgcolor="ddffdd"
| April 11 ||at Tennessee||No. 9||||9–1||Randall (3–3)||Gruver (1–2)||None||2,302||23–8||8–4
|- align="center" bgcolor="ffdddd"
| April 13 ||at No. 7 Florida StateRivalry||No. 9||Dick Howser StadiumTallahassee, FL
|2–3||Sitz (3–0)||Larson (1–1)||McGee (7)||6,526||23–9||–
|- align="center" bgcolor="ddffdd"
| April 16 ||at ||No. 9||Cliff Hagan StadiumLexington, KY
|10–8||Barfield (2–0)||Cooper (1–3)||Chapman (7)||1,996||24–9
|9–4
|- align="center" bgcolor="ddffdd"
| April 17 ||at Kentucky||No. 9||Cliff Hagan Stadium||6–3||Larson (2–1)||Rogers (4–4)||None||2,363||25–9
|10–4
|- align="center" bgcolor="ffdddd"
| April 18 ||at Kentucky||No. 9||Cliff Hagan Stadium
|5–6||Cooper (2–3)||DeSclafani (2–2)||Little (6)||2,293||25–10||10–5
|- align="center" bgcolor="ddffdd"
| April 21 ||at South Florida||No. 11||Red McEwen FieldTampa, FL||18–8||Spottswood (1–0)||Parker (0–2)||None||2,517||26–10||–
|- align="center" bgcolor="ffdddd"
| April 23 ||No. 7 Arkansas||No. 11|| McKethan Stadium ||3–8||Smyly (6–0)||Panteliodis (6–2)||None||3,622||26–11||10–6
|- align="center" bgcolor="ddffdd"
| April 24 ||No. 7 Arkansas||No. 11|| McKethan Stadium ||8–2||Randall (4–3)||Eibner (3–3)||Larson (2)||3,116||27–11
|11–6
|- align="center" bgcolor="ddffdd"
| April 25 ||No. 7 Arkansas||No. 11|| McKethan Stadium ||2–1||Chapman (2–0)||Bolsinger (4–2)||None||2,873||28–11
|12–6
|- align="center" bgcolor="ddffdd"
| April 30 ||No. 9 LSU||No. 12|| McKethan Stadium ||8–5||Panteliodis (7–2)||Ranaudo (2–2)||Chapman (8)||4,213||29–11
|13–6
|-

|- align="center" bgcolor="ddffdd"
| May 1 ||No. 9 LSU||No. 12|| McKethan Stadium ||7–3||Randall (5–3)||Matulis (5–2)||None||4,003||30–11
|14–6
|- align="center" bgcolor="ddffdd"
| May 2 ||No. 9 LSU||No. 12|| McKethan Stadium ||13–6||Johnson (4–2)||Ott (1–2)||None||3,617||31–11
|15–6
|- align="center" bgcolor="ddffdd"
| May 7 ||at Alabama||No. 6||Tuscaloosa, AL||9–3||Randall (6–3)||Morgan (5–3)||None||4,387||32–11
|16–6
|- align="center" bgcolor="ddffdd"
| May 8 ||at Alabama||No. 6||||14–8||Panteliodis (8–2)||Nelson (5–2)||None||4,273||33–11
|17–6
|- align="center" bgcolor="ffdddd"
| May 9 ||at Alabama||No. 6||||8–10||Kilcrease (4–2)||DeSclafani (2–3)||Smith (3)||4,317||33–12||17–7
|- align="center" bgcolor="ddffdd"
| May 12 ||||No. 5|| McKethan Stadium ||7–3||Barfield (3–0)||Garton (6–2)||None||3,147||34–12
|–
|- align="center" bgcolor="ddffdd"
| May 14 ||||No. 5|| McKethan Stadium ||4–3||Larson (3–1)||Moseley (0–4)||None||5,363||35–12
|18–7
|- align="center" bgcolor="ddffdd"
| May 15 ||Georgia||No. 5|| McKethan Stadium ||4–3||Chapman (3–0)||Esmonde (2–1)||None||4,932||36–12
|19–7
|- align="center" bgcolor="ddffdd"
| May 16 ||Georgia||No. 5|| McKethan Stadium ||9–3||Johnson (5–2)||Palazzone (4–6)||None||4,324||37–12
|20–7
|- align="center" bgcolor="ddffdd"
| May 18 ||||No. 5|| McKethan Stadium ||9–3||Toledo (3–1)||Patton (1–2)||None||3,314||38–12
|–
|- align="center" bgcolor="ddffdd"
| May 20 ||at No. 7 South Carolina||No. 5||Carolina StadiumColumbia, SC
|3–2||Barfield (4–0)||Cooper (10–1)||Chapman (9)||8,188||39–12
|21–7
|- align="center" bgcolor="ddffdd"
| May 21 ||at No. 7 South Carolina||No. 5||Carolina Stadium||5–2||Rodriguez (1–0)||Dyson (5–5)||Chapman (10)||8,242||40–12
|22–7
|- align="center" bgcolor="ffdddd"
| May 22 ||at No. 7 South Carolina||No. 5||Carolina Stadium||6–11||Brown (3–0)||Johnson (5–3)||None||7,523||40–13||22–8
|-

|-
! style="background:#FF4A00;color:white;"| Post-season
|-

|- align="center" bgcolor="ffdddd"
| May 26 || vs. LSU ||No. 5|| Regions ParkHoover, AL || 6–10 ||Ranaudo (4–2)||Johnson (5–4)||None||6,772||40–14||0–1
|- align="center" bgcolor="ddffdd"
| May 27 || vs. No. 12 Arkansas ||No. 5|| Regions Park || 5–4 ||Panteliodis (9–2)||Bolsinger (6–4)||Chapman (11)||5,759||41–14||1–1
|- align="center" bgcolor="ddffdd"
| May 28 || vs. No. 17 Vanderbilt ||No. 5|| Regions Park || 5–2 ||Randall (7–3)||Armstrong (7–3)||Rodriguez (1)||7,605||42–14||2–1
|- align="center" bgcolor="ffdddd"
| May 29 || vs. Alabama ||No. 5|| Regions Park || 2–57 ||Morgan (6–4)||Toledo (3–2)||None||11,542||42–15||2–2
|-

|- align="center" bgcolor="ddffdd"
| June 4 ||||No. 5|| McKethan Stadium || 7–3 ||Randall (8–3)||Simpson (6–2)||None||3,217||43–15|| 1–0
|- align="center" bgcolor="ddffdd"
| June 5 ||||No. 5|| McKethan Stadium || 10–2 ||Panteliodis (10–2)||Gaviglio (3–4)||None||2,991||44–15|| 2–0
|- align="center" bgcolor="ddffdd"
| June 6 ||Florida Atlantic||No. 5|| McKethan Stadium || 15–0 ||Johnson (6–4)||Everist (2–8)||None||2,302||45–15|| 3–0
|-

|- align="center" bgcolor="ddffdd"
| June 11 ||No. 14 Miami (FL)Rivalry||No. 5|| McKethan Stadium ||7–2||Panteliodis (11–2)||Gutierrez (5–3)||None||5,429||46–15|| 1–0
|- align="center" bgcolor="ddffdd"
| June 12 ||No. 14 Miami (FL)Rivalry||No. 5|| McKethan Stadium ||4–310||Rodriguez (2–0)||Miranda (5–3)||Larson (3)||5,783||47–15|| 2–0
|-

|- align="center" bgcolor="ffdddd"
| June 19 || vs. No. 7 UCLA ||No. 5||Rosenblatt StadiumOmaha, NE
| 3–11 ||Bauer (11–3)||Panteliodis (11–3)||None||23,271||47–16|| 0–1
|- align="center" bgcolor="ffdddd"
| June 21 || vs. No. 12 Florida StateRivalry ||No. 5|| Rosenblatt Stadium || 5–8 ||Busch (6–2)||Randall (8–4)||McGee (13)||19,841||47–17|| 0–2
|-

Rankings from USA Today/ESPN Coaches' Poll. All times Eastern. Retrieved from FloridaGators.com

See also 
 Florida Gators
 List of Florida Gators baseball players

External links 
 Gator Baseball official website

Florida Gators baseball seasons
Florida Gators baseball team
Florida Gators
College World Series seasons
Florida